Our Lady of Walsingham is a title of Mary, mother of Jesus venerated by Catholics, Western Rite Orthodox Christians, and some Anglicans associated with the Marian apparitions to Richeldis de Faverches, a pious English noblewoman,  in 1061 in the village of Walsingham in Norfolk, England. Lady Richeldis had a structure built named "The Holy House" in Walsingham which later became a shrine and place of pilgrimage.

In passing on his guardianship of the Holy House, Richeldis's son Geoffrey left instructions for the building of a priory in Walsingham. The priory passed into the care of the Canons Regular of Saint Augustine, sometime between 1146 and 1174.

By a rescript of 6 February 1897, Pope Leo XIII blessed a new statue for the restored ancient sanctuary of Our Lady of Walsingham. This was sent from Rome and placed in the Holy House Chapel at the newly built Catholic parish church of King's Lynn (the village of Walsingham was within the parish) on 19 August 1897 and on the following day the first post-Reformation pilgrimage took place to the Slipper Chapel at Walsingham, which was purchased by Charlotte Boyd(e) in 1895 and restored for Catholic use. Hundreds of Catholics attended the pilgrimage and committed themselves to an annual pilgrimage (from 1897 to 1934 on Whitsun) to commemorate this event. 

Pope Pius XII granted a canonical coronation to the Catholic image via the Papal Nuncio, Bishop Gerald O'Hara, on 15 August 1954 with a gold crown funded by her female devotees, now venerated in the Basilica of Our Lady of Walsingham.

The feast day of Our Lady of Walsingham is kept on 24 September in both the Anglican and Catholic churches. Anglicans, especially in the Society of Our Lady of Walsingham and at the Anglican shrine, keep an additional feast of translation on 15 October annually, the anniversary of the translation of the image from Walsingham's parish church to the shrine church in 1931. In the United States several local churches keep the translation (15 October) as the principal feast of Our Lady of Walsingham, including the Episcopal Church, ROCOR Western Rite, and the Antiochian Orthodox Christian Archdiocese of North America.

History

Marian apparition

According to the tradition, in a Marian apparition to Lady Richeldis, the Blessed Virgin Mary fetched Richeldis’ soul from England to Nazareth during a religious ecstasy to show the house where the Holy Family once lived and in which the Annunciation of Archangel Gabriel occurred. Richeldis was given the task of building a replica house in her village, in England. The building came to be known as the "Holy House", and later became both a shrine and a focus of pilgrimage to Walsingham. 

The modern wooden image was carved in Oberammergau, Germany, and was once associated with the Virgin of Mercy under the venerated Marian title of Our Lady of Ransom, sometimes locally worded as "Our Lady of the Dowry". The popularity of the Marian cult gradually localized the place of devotion as "Our Lady of Walsingham".

Holy House and pilgrimages
The historian J. C. Dickinson argues that the chapel was founded in the time of Edward the Confessor, about 1053, the earliest deeds naming Richeldis, the mother of Geoffrey of Favraches, as the founder. Dickinson claims that in 1169, Geoffrey granted "to God and St Mary and to Edwy his clerk the chapel of our Lady" which his mother had founded at Walsingham with the intention that Edwy should found a priory. These gifts were, shortly afterwards, confirmed to the Augustinian Canons of Walsingham by Robert de Brucurt and Roger, Earl of Clare.

However, historian Bill Flint (2015) has disputed the foundation date established by Dickinson, arguing that the 1161 Norfolk Roll refers to the foundation of the priory only and not the shrine. Flint supports the earlier date of 1061 given in the Pynson Ballad and claims that in this year, Queen Edith the Fair, Lady of the Manor, was the likely Walsingham visionary. 

By the time of its destruction in 1538 during the reign of Henry VIII, the shrine had become one of the greatest religious centres in England and Europe, together with Glastonbury and Canterbury. It had been a place of pilgrimage during medieval times, when due to wars and political upheaval, travel to Rome and Santiago de Compostela was tedious and difficult.

Nevertheless, royal patronage helped the shrine to grow both in wealth and popularity, receiving regal visits from the following kings and queen: 
 King Henry III
 King Edward I
 King Edward II
 King Henry IV
 King Edward IV
 King Henry VII
 King Henry VIII
 Queen Catherine of Aragon

Visiting in 1513, Desiderius Erasmus wrote the following:

It was also a place of pilgrimage for Queen Catherine of Aragon who was a regular pilgrim. Likewise, Anne Boleyn also publicly announced an intention of making a pilgrimage but it never occurred. Its wealth and prestige did not, however, prevent its being a disorderly house. The visitation of Bishop Nicke in 1514 revealed that the prior was leading a scandalous life and that, among many other things, he treated the canons with insolence and brutality; the canons themselves frequented taverns and were quarrelsome. The prior, William Lowth, was removed and by 1526 some decent order had been restored.

Destruction

The suppression of the monasteries was part of the English Reformation. On the pretext of discovering any irregularities in their life, Thomas Cromwell organised a series of visitations, the results of which led to the suppression of smaller foundations (which did not include Walsingham) in 1536. Six years earlier the prior, Richard Vowell, had signed their acceptance of the king's supremacy, but it did not save them. Cromwell's actions were politically motivated, but the canons, who had a number of houses in Norfolk, were not noted for their piety or good order. The prior was evidently compliant but not all of the community felt likewise. In 1537, two lay choristers organised "the most serious plot hatched anywhere south of the Trent", intended to resist what they feared, rightly as it turned out, would happen to their foundation. Eleven men were executed as a result. The sub-prior, Nicholas Milcham, was charged with conspiring to rebel against the suppression of the lesser monasteries, and on flimsy evidence was convicted of high treason and hanged outside the priory walls.

The suppression of the Walsingham priory came late in 1538, under the supervision of Sir Roger Townshend, a local landowner. Walsingham was famous and its fall symbolic.

The priory buildings were looted and largely destroyed, but the memory of it was less easy to eradicate. Sir Roger wrote to Cromwell in 1564 that a woman of nearby Wells (now called Wells-Next-The-Sea) had declared that a miracle had been done by the statue after it had been carried away to London. He had the woman put in the stocks on market day to be abused by the village folk but concluded "I cannot perceyve but the seyd image is not yett out of the sum of ther heddes."

The site of the priory with the churchyard and gardens was granted by the Crown to Thomas Sydney. All that remained of it was the gatehouse, the great east window arch and a few outbuildings. The Elizabethan ballad, "A Lament for Walsingham", expresses something of what the Norfolk people felt at the loss of their shrine of Our Lady of Walsingham.

Fate of the statue
John Hussey wrote to Lord Lisle in 1538: "July 18th: This day our late Lady of Walsingham was brought to Lambhithe (Lambeth) where was both my Lord Chancellor and my Lord Privy Seal, with many virtuous prelates, but there was offered neither oblation nor candle : what shall become of her is not determined." The image is said to have been burned with images from other shrines at some point, publicly, in London.  Two chroniclers, Hall and Speed, suggest that the actual burning did not take place until September.

Although Hussey claimed to have witnessed the removal of the image (statue) of Our Lady of Walsingham to London, there is no extant eyewitness account of its destruction. Whilst there are claims that the image was destroyed, these do not agree on the location or date of destruction. There have been persistent suggestions that the image may in fact have been rescued and hidden by parties loyal to the tradition of veneration. On 23 December 1925 a medieval madonna and child statue, named the Langham Madonna, was purchased by the Victoria and Albert Museum. As early as 1931 the leading anglo-papalist clergyman Henry Joy Fynes-Clinton suggested that the Langham Madonna could be the original image from Walsingham. The remaining parts (it is incomplete) bear a striking resemblance to the image's depiction on the medieval Walsingham Priory seal. In 2019 English art historians Michael Rear and Francis Young, having studied the provenance, form, and damage to the Langham Madonna, published their conclusions (originally through the Catholic Herald) that it is actually the original statue of Our Lady of Walsingham.

Modern revival

After nearly four hundred years the 20th century saw the restoration of pilgrimage to Walsingham as a regular feature of Christian life in the British Isles and beyond. There are major Catholic and Anglican shrines in Walsingham, as well as a smaller Orthodox one.

Slipper Chapel
In 1340, the Slipper Chapel was built at Houghton St Giles, a mile outside Walsingham. This was the final "station" chapel on the way to Walsingham. It was here that pilgrims would remove their shoes to walk the final "Holy Mile" to the shrine barefoot. Hence the designation ‘Slipper’ Chapel.

In 1896, Charlotte Pearson Boyd purchased the 14th-century Slipper Chapel, which had seen centuries of secular use, and set about its restoration.

In 1897, Pope Leo XIII re-established the Holy House, rebuilt at the Church of the Annunciation at King's Lynn, as a Catholic shrine (Walsingham was part of this Catholic parish in 1897). At the same time, a statue, carved at Oberammergau and blessed by Pope Leo XIII was placed there. Since 1934, the restored 14th-century Slipper Chapel has been the National Shrine of Our Lady of Walsingham.

Anglican shrine

The Anglican Shrine of Our Lady of Walsingham was created in 1931, and enlarged in 1938. In 1921, Fr Hope Patten was appointed Vicar of Walsingham. He set up a statue of Our Lady of Walsingham, in the Parish Church of St Mary. It was based on the design of the original statue, as found on the medieval seal of Walsingham Priory.

As the number of pilgrims to the site increased, a new chapel was dedicated in 1931 and the statue was moved to it in an elaborate translation procession on 15 October 1931. The chapel was extended in 1938 to form the current Anglican shrine church.

Veneration

Locally

There is frequently an ecumenical dimension to pilgrimages to Walsingham, with many pilgrims arriving at the Slipper Chapel and then walking to the Holy House at the Anglican shrine. Student Cross is the longest continuous walking pilgrimage in Britain to Walsingham which takes place over Holy Week and Easter.

Overseas
In the United States the National Shrine to Our Lady of Walsingham for the Episcopal Church (part of the Anglican Communion) is located in Grace Church, Sheboygan, Wisconsin, and for the Catholic Church at Saint Bede's Church, Williamsburg, Virginia. The personal ordinariate established for former Anglicans in England and Wales is named for Our Lady of Walsingham. The cathedral of the Personal Ordinariate of the Chair of St. Peter in Houston, Texas, is named for Our Lady of Walsingham. The Catholic national shrine of Our Lady of Walsingham is a separate chapel that belongs to the parish of St. Bede's Church in Williamsburg, Virginia. Western Rite Antiochian Orthodox parish named for Our Lady of Walsingham is in Mesquite, Texas. There is a blue Anglican devotional scapular known as the Scapular of Our Lady of Walsingham.

Pontifical approbations
 Pope Leo XIII issued a Papal decree from Rome blessing the Marian image for public veneration on 6 February 1897.
 Pope Pius XII granted a canonical coronation to the Catholic image via the Papal Nuncio, Bishop Gerald O'Hara, on 15 August 1954 with a gold crown funded by her female devotees, now venerated in the Basilica of Our Lady of Walsingham.
 Pope John Paul II venerated the image for Pentecost at the Wembley Stadium on 29 May 1982 during an open-air Holy Mass.
 Pope Francis raised her sanctuary to the status of a minor basilica on 27 December 2015 through an apostolic decree from the Congregation for Divine Worship and the Discipline of the Sacraments.

See also 
 Anglican Marian theology
 Dowry of Mary
 Our Lady of Cardigan
 Our Lady of Doncaster
 Our Lady of Ipswich
 Our Lady of Westminster
 Cathedral of Our Lady of Walsingham (Houston)

References

Further reading 
 Dominic Janes and Gary Waller (eds), Walsingham in Literature and Culture from the Middle Ages to Modernity (Aldershot, Ashgate, 2010).
 John Rayne-Davis, Peter Rollings, Walsingham: England’s National Shrine of Our Lady (London, 2010).
 Waller, Gary. Walsingham and the English Imagination. (Aldershot, Ashgate, 2011).
Bill Flint, "Edith the Fair" (Gracewing, 2015).

External links 

Anglican National Shrine of Our Lady of Walsingham
Official website of the Anglican and Roman Catholic shrines
English Roman Catholic National Shrine of Our Lady
Orthodox church in Walsingham
US Friends of Our Lady of Walsingham - Episcopal Church
Icon of Our Lady of Walsingham, St Paul's Church (Episcopal) in Washington, District of Columbia, United States
Cell of the Holy House of Our Lady of Walsingham, St Thomas the Apostle Church (Episcopal) in Hollywood, California, United States
Our Lady of Walsingham Orthodox Christian Church in Mesquite, Texas, United States
Houses of Austin canons: The priory of Walsingham at British History Online
link to the text of the 15th century Pynson Ballad, recounting the story of the Walsingham shrine
United States National Catholic Shrine of Our Lady

1153 establishments in England
Anglo-Catholicism
Anglican Mariology
Shrines to the Virgin Mary
Catholic pilgrimage sites
Anglican National Shrines
Christianity in medieval England
Walsingham
Titles of Mary
1060s in England
History of Norfolk
Roman Catholic shrines in the United Kingdom
Walsingham
Western Rite Orthodoxy